Events in the year 1894 in India.

Incumbents
 Empress of India – Queen Victoria
 Viceroy of India – Henry Petty-Fitzmaurice, 5th Marquess of Lansdowne
 Viceroy of India – Victor Bruce, 9th Earl of Elgin (from 11 October)

Events
 National income - 4,869 million
Punjab National Bank was founded by Lala Lajpat Rai

Law
Prisons Act
Land Acquisition Act

Births
1 January – Satyendra Nath Bose, physicist (d.1974).
21 February – Shanti Swaroop Bhatnagar, scientist (d.1955).
25 February – Meher Baba, mystic and spiritual master (d.1969).
10 April – Ghanshyam Das Birla, businessman (d.1983).
20 May  Chandrashekarendra Saraswati, 68th Jagadguru of Kanchi Kamakoti Peetam (d.1994).

Full date unknown
A.B. Purani, disciple and biographer of Sri Aurobindo (d.1965).

Deaths

References

 
India
Years of the 19th century in India